Hwanghak-dong Flea Market is a market located in the neighborhood of Hwanghak-dong, Jung-gu, Seoul, South Korea to sell second-hand goods. It has over 500 shops and stalls near Dongdaemun Market supplying a wide range of used products such as electronic appliances, clothes, and other items. The market is also called Dokkaebi Market (lit. "Goblin Market"). It is located behind Samil Apartment and Cheonggyecheon.

See also
List of markets in South Korea
List of South Korean tourist attractions

References

External links
Hwanghakdong market has everything at the English Chosun Ilbo

Jung District, Seoul
Retail markets in Seoul
Flea markets